Alfred Leonard Nelson (13 November 1871 – 2 May 1927) was an English cricketer. Nelson was a right-handed batsman who occasionally fielded as a wicket-keeper. He was born at Kenilworth, Warwickshire, and was educated at Radley College and Merton College, Oxford.

Nelson made a single first-class appearance for Warwickshire against Lancashire in the 1895 County Championship at Aigburth, Liverpool. Warwickshire won the toss and elected to bat first, making 207 all out, during which Nelson was dismissed for a duck by Albert Hallam. Lancashire responded in their first-innings by making 138 all out, to which Warwickshire responded to in their second-innings by making 222 all out, during which Nelson was again dismissed for a duck, this time by Arthur Mold. Lancashire were set a target of 292 for victory, but were dismissed for 175 in their second-innings chase.

He died at Holly Green, Worcestershire, on 2 May 1927. His nephew, Guy Nelson, played first-class cricket.

References

External links
Alfred Nelson at ESPNcricinfo
Alfred Nelson at CricketArchive

1871 births
1927 deaths
People from Kenilworth
People educated at Radley College
Alumni of Merton College, Oxford
English cricketers
Warwickshire cricketers